Route 122 is a numbered state highway running  in Rhode Island, United States. Its southern terminus is at U.S. Route 1 (US 1) in Pawtucket, and its northern terminus is at the Massachusetts border where it continues as Massachusetts Route 122.

Route description
Route 122 takes the following route through the State:

Pawtucket: ; U.S. 1 to Central Falls city line
Main Street and Lonsdale Avenue
Central Falls: ; Pawtucket city line to Lincoln town line
Lonsdale Avenue
Lincoln: ; Central Falls city line to Cumberland town line
Lonsdale Avenue
Cumberland: ; Lincoln town line to Woonsocket city line
Mendon Road
Woonsocket: ; Cumberland town line to Massachusetts State line at Route 122
Mendon Road, Cumberland Hill Road, Hamlet Avenue, Court Street, [High Street] (Main Street, Arnold Street), Arnold Street, Railroad Street and Harris Avenue

History

Route 122 used to extend south along US 1 into Providence then along Randall Street to end at Charles Street (present-day Route 246).

Major intersections

References

External links

2019 Highway Map, Rhode Island

122
Transportation in Providence County, Rhode Island